Paul Lazarus (born October 25) is an American director, producer and writer of film, television and theatre.

He graduated from Dartmouth College, and apprenticed with the Royal Shakespeare Company in England.

Directing credits
Big Time Rush
I'm in the Band
Las Vegas
Psych 
Ugly Betty
In Case of Emergency
Samantha Who?
Jake in Progress
Grounded for Life
Kristin
Seven Girlfriends (feature film directorial debut, 1999)
Everybody Loves Raymond
Buddies
Partners
Murder, She Wrote
Ned & Stacey
Baywatch
2gether: The Series
Friends
Melrose Place
Models Inc.
Dream On
Class of '96
Jack's Place
Mad About You
Beverly Hills, 90210
L.A. Law
Teech
Pretty Little Liars
True Jackson, VP
The Middle

Theatre credits
In the early 90s, he served as the artistic director of the historic Pasadena Playhouse. Lazarus has directed over eighty plays and musicals. His play, A Tale of Charles Dickens, co-written with Janet Jones, was produced and recorded for radio by Los Angeles Theater Works in association with the Antaeus Theater Company. Other credits include directing Neil Simon's Biloxi Blues, Personals (which was written by Marta Kauffman, David Crane, Stephen Schwartz and Alan Menken), Kristin Chenoweth in her solo concert debut, The People vs. Mona, Mark St. Germain's Camping With Henry And Tom (starring Robert Prosky, Ronny Cox and John Cunningham) and The 24th Day (starring Noah Wyle and Peter Berg).

Other work
Lazarus also went on to voice direct Dreamworks Animation's only direct to video film Joseph: King of Dreams in 2000.

Awards and nominations
Los Angeles Dramalogue Award: Best Director (The 24th Day) WON
Drama Desk Award: Best Director (Personals)

External links and references

External links
LAist Interview
Online 49er Interview
FilmMakerMagazine

1954 births
Businesspeople from Philadelphia
American film directors
American television directors
American theatre directors
American voice directors
Dartmouth College alumni
Living people